Arvada Ridge station is a Regional Transportation District (RTD) commuter rail station on the G Line between Denver Union Station and Wheat Ridge, Colorado. The station is located in western Arvada, Colorado, on the west side of Kipling Parkway and near Red Rocks Community College's Arvada campus. It includes bus bays, a 200-stall park and ride, and a pedestrian underpass connecting the platform to Ridge Road and the park and ride. Public art at the station includes "Chromatic Harvest", a kaleidoscopic mural wall with geometric imagery of agriculture. The station opened on April 26, 2019.

The Arvada Ridge area has been the site of the city's "education-focused" transit-oriented development, which has included new apartment buildings and retailers to the south of the park and ride. RTD plans to begin new bus service between the Arvada Ridge and Olde Town Arvada stations when the G Line opens on April 26, 2019.

References

Railway stations in the United States opened in 2019
RTD commuter rail stations
Arvada, Colorado
2019 establishments in Colorado